Marlann Flores (born Marlann Ponciano Flores; February 11, 1993 in San Pedro City, Laguna, Philippines), is a Filipino actress and model. She is now a freelance artist.

Early life 
She began her acting career in 2010, with several minor television and film roles, and played a regular role on the Imortal television show. She appeared in hit movies like No Other Woman and Bride for Rent. Marlann also played the role of Sally in the hit television show Dyesebel.

Career 
In 2008, Marlann Flores was entitled Ms. Teen Earth Philippines. And in 2009 she won Ms. Teen Earth International held in Singapore.

She was one of the talents of Star Magic and was under contract with ABS-CBN.

In 2010, she appeared as Marlann, a rich teenager, in Gimik 2010. She also portrayed the role of Olive/Olivia in the supernatural-fantasy horror TV series, Imortal, In the series' plot, she was a human who was turned into a vampire by her lover Gael and at the same time, resurrected her dead body. She was one of the thirty young stars that took part in Camp Nivea, a three-day event that features modelling and fashion, and skills that a rising star would need.

In 2011, Marlann started to appear in Maalaala Mo Kaya. She performed the role of a young girl named Karen in the episode "Bibliya" along with Martin Del Rosario, Mercedes Cabral and Ian Veneracion. She also appeared in No Other Woman as Charmaine's sister. She appeared in Won't Last A Day Without You with Gerald Anderson and Sarah Geronimo.

In 2012, she appeared in the Maalaala Mo Kaya episode "Kurtina" as a girl who agrees to live with a guy named Akhmed(JM De Guzman) for seven hundred pesos.

She transferred from ABS-CBN to GMA Network in 2016 and is currently a mainstay in the sitcom Hay, Bahay! playing the character of household helper, Bolina.

Filmography

Television

Movies

References 

  Ching, Mark Angelo (2010-03-12)  "Teen stars have fun under the sun in Camp Nivea" News. Philippine Entertainment Portal. Retrieved 2011-08-27
  Siazon, Rachelle (2011-08-27) "On Maalaala Mo Kaya: Ian Veneracion and Martin del Rosario fight over one girl"Entertainment Guide / Television. ABS-CBN Website. Retrieved 2011-08-27
 Jarloc, Glaiza   (2011-08-27) "Joining this Saturday's episode are Marlann Flores, Mara Lopez and actress Mercedes Cabral."  Entertainment Guide / Television. SunStar Manila. Retrieved 2011-08-27.
  "Marlann Flores explains why she transfer to GMA Network"

External links
  Marlann Flores' page on Twitter
  Marlann Flores' page on Facebook

1993 births
Living people
Filipino television actresses
People from San Pedro, Laguna
Actresses from Laguna (province)
People from Quezon
Tagalog people
Filipino film actresses
Star Magic
ABS-CBN personalities
GMA Network personalities
Filipino Christians
Filipino evangelicals
Filipino Pentecostals